Jason Michael "Big Jay" Oakerson (born December 7, 1977) is an American stand-up comedian, radio show host, podcaster and actor.

Life and career
Oakerson was born in Philadelphia, Pennsylvania and grew up in West Philadelphia. Oakerson moved to the Blackwood section of Gloucester Township, New Jersey with his mother and step-father who worked full-time, in his senior year of high school. His father was absent for most of his childhood. He enrolled at Camden Community College but left after a month to pursue comedy. He worked as a chauffeur/bouncer for strippers and children's parties to make ends meet. He has opened for Dave Attell and toured with Korn before touring as a headliner.

His television credits include Comedy Central's Premium Blend, Comedy Central Presents, Inside Amy Schumer, Tough Crowd with Colin Quinn, and This Is Not Happening with Ari Shaffir, along with multiple appearances on BET's Comic View, HBO's P. Diddy's Bad Boys of Comedy and Crashing. He co-hosted Movies on Tap on Spike TV. He played Neil on the series Z Rock and appeared in the pilot episode of Louie, as well as an episode in the third season. On December 1, 2014, Oakerson headlined a free charity show for supporters of morning show Preston & Steve and radio station WMMR in Philadelphia for the annual Campout for Hunger which supports Philabundance. On June 17, 2016, Oakerson released his first hour long special titled, Live At Webster Hall. He also hosted Big Jay Oakerson's What's Your F@%king Deal?! on Seeso.

Podcast and radio show host
Oakerson hosts a podcast called Legion of Skanks with fellow comedians, Luis J. Gomez and Dave Smith. He also co-hosts the podcast The SDR Show on Gas Digital Network's station with Ralph Sutton (who co-owns the network with Luis J. Gomez).

On July 27, 2015, Oakerson, along with fellow stand-up comedian Dan Soder, began their two-hour live radio talk show, The Bonfire, on SiriusXM's Comedy Central Radio channel airing every Monday through Thursday (previously Mondays and Wednesdays) from 6-8pm EST. As of March 1, 2021, the show has aired on Faction Talk from 5-7pm EST after Comedy Central Radio ceased production on all of its talk shows.

Personal life
Oakerson is separated from his wife Carla and they share custody of their daughter. He has been in a long-term relationship with Christine Evans, a radio producer. Oakerson is Jewish.

References

External links
 
Big Jay Oakerson official site
"Men Seeking Men" bit on Comedy Central

Living people
Male actors from Philadelphia
1977 births
American male television actors
American male comedians
American podcasters
American stand-up comedians
Jewish American male actors
21st-century American comedians
People from Gloucester Township, New Jersey
Comedians from New Jersey
Comedians from Pennsylvania
21st-century American Jews